Godor North Top is a top of Cadair Berwyn in north east Wales. It is the lower twin summit of Godor.

The summit is a grassy, marked by a pile of stones.

References

External links
 www.geograph.co.uk : photos of Cadair Berwyn and surrounding area

Mountains and hills of Denbighshire
Nuttalls
Mountains and hills of Powys

cy:Cadair Berwyn